Tomnatec may refer to two villages in Romania:

 Tomnatec, a village in Bistra Commune, Alba County
 Tomnatec, a village in Bulzeștii de Sus Commune, Hunedoara County

See also
Tomnatic